These are the official results of the Women's 1500 metres event at the 2001 IAAF World Championships in Edmonton, Canada.

Medalists

Results

Heats
Qualification: First 6 in each heat (Q) and the next 6 fastest (q) advanced to the semifinals.

Semifinals
Qualification: First 6 in each semifinal qualified directly (Q) for the final.

Final

References
 Finals Results
 Semi-finals results
 Heats results

1500
1500 metres at the World Athletics Championships
2001 in women's athletics